Styx is the debut album by American rock band Styx. It was released in 1972.

Background

The band started as a cover band who played events such as weddings and birthday parties. They called themselves The Tradewinds in 1961, when the band was composed of, at 12 years of age, Chuck and John Panozzo, who played bass guitar and drums, respectively, and their neighbor, 14-year-old Dennis DeYoung on keyboards, accordion and vocals. They later named themselves TW4, after adding their college friend John Curulewski in 1968, and the south side hard rocker James "J.Y." Young in 1970, as guitarists, songwriters and singers for the band.
 
Their debut album showcased them as a progressive-art rock/'60s garage rock act. It contained the 13-minute opus "Movement for the Common Man," and J.Y. rocker "Children of the Land." It also features John Panozzo's percussion solo, the street interviews from Chicago "Street Collage," their symphonic rocker rendition of "Fanfare for the Common Man" and the prog-folk piece, sung by DeYoung and co-written by Young & DeYoung, "Mother Nature's Matinee."
 
The upbeat pop rocker "Best Thing" was co-written by DeYoung and Young, released as a single in late '72, and peaked at No. 82 on the charts.
 
The remaining songs on the album were cover versions that the record label suggested. The band members, including DeYoung, said that they had never heard of them before.

The album was reissued in 1979 under the title Styx I with new artwork. In late 2012, it was re-released for CD and digital download, along with Styx II (1973), The Serpent Is Rising (1973), and Man of Miracles (1974).

Track listing

Personnel

Styx
 Dennis DeYoung – vocals, keyboards
 James "JY" Young – vocals, electric guitars
 John Curulewski – vocals, electric and acoustic guitars
 Chuck Panozzo – bass guitar
 John Panozzo – drums, percussion

Production
 Producers - John Ryan, Bill Traut
 Engineers - Marty Feldman, Barry Mraz
 Mixing - Barry Mraz, John Ryan

Charts
Singles - Billboard (United States)

References

External links 
 Styx - Styx (1972) album review by Lindsay Planer, credits & releases at AllMusic.com
 Styx - Styx (1972) album releases & credits at Discogs.com
 Styx - Styx (1972) album credits & user reviews at ProgArchives.com
 Styx - Styx (1972) album to be listened as stream at Spotify.com

1972 debut albums
Styx (band) albums